Augsburger Straße is a Berlin U-Bahn station on the  line. It is located in Charlottenburg under Nürnberger Straße where Augsburger Straße crosses it. Station and street are named after the city of Augsburg.

Augsburger Straße station was built in 1960/61 and opened on 8 May 1961, after the replacement of the Nürnberger Platz station by the new Spichernstraße interchange with the U9 line left too great a distance between stations for centre-city service. It is 491 m north of the Spichernstraße station and 615 m south of Wittenbergplatz.

The station has 2 side platforms with exits at each end and a passenger tunnel under the tracks. The walls are tiled in dark orange or "red-brown". As at Spichernstraße, there is a drop ceiling which causes a powerful draught. There are only stairs at the exits, thus this station is inaccessible to people with mobility problems.

References

External links
 Plan of station and surroundings, Berliner Verkehrsbetriebe (pdf)

U3 (Berlin U-Bahn) stations
Buildings and structures in Charlottenburg-Wilmersdorf
Railway stations in Germany opened in 1961